Ngadha (previously spelled Ngada) is an Austronesian language, one of six languages spoken in the central stretch of the Indonesian island of Flores. From west to east these languages are Ngadha, Nage, Keo, Ende, Lio, and Palu'e. These languages form the proposed Central Flores group of the Sumba–Flores languages, according to Blust (2009).

Ngadha is one of the few languages with a retroflex implosive .

Phonology
The sound system of Ngadha is as follows.

Vowels

The short vowel  is written  followed by a double consonant, since phonetically a consonant becomes geminate after . It is never stressed and does not form sequences with other vowels except where glottal stop has dropped (e.g.  'six', from  'five' and  'one'). 

Within vowel sequences, epenthetic  may appear after an unrounded vowel (e.g. in) and  after a rounded vowel (e.g. in). Double vowels are sequences. Vowels tend to be voiceless between voiceless consonants and pre-pausa after voiceless consonants. 

Stress is on the penultimate syllable, unless that contains the vowel , in which case stress is on the final syllable.

Consonants

The velar fricatives are spelled .

Intervocalically the implosives are preceded by a glottal stop. Initial  may be voiceless when the following consonant is also an implosive. 

The trill is short, and may have only one or two contacts. 

Glottal stop contrasts with zero in initial position, as in  'drink' vs  'tiny'. In rapid speech it tends to drop intervocalically. 

Phonetically  words are analyzed as having an initial schwa. In initial position the consonant is always voiced (otherwise the schwa remains). Examples are   'father',   'mosquito',   'sand',   (name),   'swadling sling',   'grandparents',   (name),   'sun' – also in medial position with voiceless consonants, as in   'six'.

References

External links
Ngadha Basic Vocabulary Database, University of Auckland

Languages of Indonesia
Sumba languages
Flores Island (Indonesia)
Isolating languages